Sardar Jainuddin (1 March 1918 – 22 December 1986) was a Bangladeshi novelist. He was awarded Bangla Academy Literary Award in 1967 and Ekushey Padak in 1994 posthumously.

Early life
Jainuddin was born in Kamarhati village, Sujanagar, Pabna District in 1918.

Awards
 Adamjee Literature Award (Adamjee Sahitya Puroskar), 1968
 Bangla Academy Award, 1968
 Silver Medal, Frankfurt International Book Fair, 1974–75
 Bank Award – Children Literature (Bank Puroskar Shishu Sahitya), 1981
 Agrani Bank Award – Children Literature (Agrani Bank Puroskar- Shishu Shahitya) – 1982
 Ekushey Padak (Posthumous), 1994.
 He was also awarded "Tamghaye Imtiaz" award in early 1971 by the then Pakistan Government. But he refused the award in support of the non-cooperation movement called by Bangabandhu Sheikh Mujibur Rahman in March 1971.

Works

Career
 1941-47: British Indian Army, during second world war, as Quarter Master Habildar. He left the job on 31-10-47 (Released) and came to his own country East Pakistan. He tried to do some business with the money he got from the service, but it did not work.
 1948: Manager Mukul, a journal for the youth (Kishore Potrika)
 1948-51: As assistant in the Advertisement section of the Daily Pakistan Observer
 1949: Publisher and Manager Chandrabindu a fortnightly published paper
 1950: Publisher and Manager of a monthly paper Mukti
 1951-55: Manager, Advertisement section, Daily Sangbad
 1955-56: Editor "Shaheen" and “Sitara" two fortnightly published paper for children and youth
 1956-57: Director, Printer and publisher of an English literature paper "The Republic", published quarterly (every three months)
 1958: Manager, Advertisement section, The Daily Ittafaq
 1959: Deputy General Manager, The Daily Ittehad
 1959: General Secretary of Titas Publication Society (Titas Prokashony Sangstha)
 1960: Inspector, Eastern Federal Insurance Company.
 1961-64: Assistant Publication Officer, Bangla Academy
 1964: Research Officer, National Book Centre of Pakistan
 1966: Assistant Director, National Book Centre of Pakistan
 1972-78: Director, Jatiyo Grantho Kendro (former National Book Center of Pakistan was converted to Jatio Grantho Kendro after Independence of Bangladesh)
 1978-80: Senior Specialist Textbook Board (till retirement)

Novels
 Adiganta (1958)
 Pannamoti (1965)
 Neel Rong Rokto (1965)
 Onek Surger Asha (1967)
 Begum Shefali Mirza (1968)
 Shrimoti Ka o Kha Ebong Shriman Taleb Ali (1973)
 Bidhosto Roder Dheu (1975)
 Kodom Alider Bari (1989)

Short story collections
 Nayan Dhuli – 7 stories (1952)
 Birkonthir Biye – 12 stories (1955)
 Khorossrot – 11 stories (1956)
 Oshtoprohor – 14 stories (1971)
 Bela Banarjeer Prem – 10 stories (1973)
 Matir Kachakachi – 10 stories (2010)
 Children-Youth Literature
 Obak Obhijan (1964)
 Ulta Rajar Deshe (1970)
 Tukur Bhugal Path (1979)
 Amra Tomader Bhulbo Na (1981)

Poetry
 Sadar Jainuddin er Chara – 56 poems (1990)

Translation
 Folk Tales of Asia – Part IV (Asiar Lok Kahini, Choturtha Vag), Translated in Bengali from English version, (1990)

Samagra
 Golpo Samagra (2006)
 Kishore Samagra (2010)

Personal life 
Jayenuddin's son, Zia Ahmed, was a major general in Bangladesh Army and former chairman of Bangladesh Telecommunication Regulatory Commission.

References

1918 births
1986 deaths
Bangladeshi male writers
Recipients of Bangla Academy Award
Recipients of the Ekushey Padak
People from Sujanagar Upazila
Pabna Edward College alumni
20th-century Bangladeshi writers
20th-century male writers